Tibga  is a department or commune of Gourma Province in north-eastern Burkina Faso. Its capital lies at the town of Tibga.

Towns and villages

References

Departments of Burkina Faso
Gourma Province